Lymire lacina is a moth of the subfamily Arctiinae. It was described by Schaus in 1924. It is found on Cuba.

References

Euchromiina
Moths described in 1924
Endemic fauna of Cuba